Olavsfestdagene (initiated 1962 under the name Olavsdagene) is a church and cultural festival held in Trondheim around Olsok every year.

Background 
During the festival more than 300 events with 800 international and Norwegian artists are presented (2005). The events take place at venues throughout the city, like Nidaros Cathedral, Olavshallen, The Norwegian Freemasonry, Vår Frue kirke, Rica Nidelven Arena and on the outdoor stage in Borggården at Erkebispegården and Torvet (the marked place). Orchestras, bands, soloists, choirs, opera and actors perform for a visitors and residents audience. There are also historical markets with games, jugglers and trade in the courtyard, and a plethora of activities for children and youth, including treasure hunts, music workshop and stone carving. Other events are jousting, exhibitions, church services, courses, lectures and pilgrimage program. Every night during Olavsfestdagene Jazzvaka is also held at the Kjeller’n in Olavskvartalet.

In 2015  the Olavsfestdagene takes place in the period July 28 - August 2, and are visited by the international artist Sting.

History 
Olavsfestdagenes is historically anchored in the veneration of Olaf II of Norway. Today's festival is a continuation of the tradition of Olavsdagene, which started in 1962. Pilgrims from many countries choose to visit Nidaros Cathedral during the festival. Olavsfestdagene is one out of four junction festivals (knutepunktfestivaler) with national status in Norway, and has the task of ensuring the church fete celebration in Nidaros Cathedral and the worship of Olav.

Randi Wenche Haugen was festival director from August 11, 2008 to August 31, 2013. Petter Myhr, former director at the popular music museum Rockheim, replaced her in a fixed term position September 1, 2013.

References

External links 

Christian music festivals
Music festivals established in 1962
Music festivals in Norway
Music in Trondheim
1962 establishments in Norway
Recurring events established in 1962
Festivals in Trondheim
Culture in Trondheim
Summer events in Norway